What to Expect When You're Expecting is a pregnancy guide, now in its fifth edition, authored by Heidi Murkoff and Sharon Mazel and published by Workman Publishing. Its first edition, authored by Murkoff, Arlene Eisenberg, and Sandee Hathaway, was originally published in 1984. The book consistently tops The New York Times Best Seller list in the paperback advice category, is one of USA Todays "25 Most Influential Books" of the past 25 years and has been described as "the bible of American pregnancy". According to USA Today, 93 percent of all expectant mothers who read a pregnancy guide read What to Expect When You're Expecting. In 2005, WhatToExpect.com launched. The What to Expect mobile app launched on iOS in 2009 and Android in 2014. In 2012, What to Expect When You're Expecting was adapted into a film released by Lionsgate.

History 
Author Heidi Murkoff cites her own quest for reassuring information during her first pregnancy as being the motivation for developing What to Expect When You're Expecting. Murkoff collaborated with her mother Arlene Eisenberg, a freelance journalist, and her sister Sandee Hathway, a nurse, when writing the first three editions of the pregnancy guide.

Its iconic title emerged when an employee of the publisher suggested it as a subtitle for the temporarily titled manuscript, "Pregnancy:" By publication, the subtitle had claimed the top spot.

Although the book's initial print run was small, word of mouth and innovative promotion led to sales that increased in every subsequent year.

What to Expect books

What to Expect When You’re Expecting 
The book presents advice in a question-and-answer format. It proceeds chronologically from the time a woman first begins to suspect pregnancy, through each of the nine months (with one chapter devoted to each), and into the postpartum period. The beginning of each chapter includes a section called “Your Body This Month,” which succinctly lists common physical and emotional changes and symptoms a woman may be experiencing, and gives information on what a woman can expect when visiting her doctor or nurse midwife during checkups. Also included early in each chapter is a section entitled "Your Baby This Month" which displays pictures of  the growing embryo then fetus. An additional section titled "What You May Be Concerned About" is designed to address a wide range of concerns, problems and life trends. There are also “For Dads” boxes integrated throughout the book that speak to fathers’ unique concerns as partners in pregnancy, childbirth, and parenting.

The book's appendix lists additional sources of information and resources including government organizations, associations and foundations.

Controversy
What to Expect When You're Expecting has been criticized for promoting paranoia and fear among pregnant women for focusing on complications and for its extremely strict dietary guidelines. Murkoff also has no medical training and has been further criticized for stating she asks obstetricians to comment on manuscripts only late in the writing and editing processes. With the first publishing of the book being in 1984, one reason it is considered problematic is due to the many old and unrevised printings in public circulation. Although wording is revised with every single printing of the book with major rewrites indicated by new editions to respond to critiques, older copies are passed down by women to their pregnant peers.

The Science Based Medicine blog criticized the book for its recommendations of Complementary and Alternative Medicines (CAM), such as Acupuncture, Reflexology, Aromatherapy and Homeopathy. The blog post concludes: There is no credible scientific evidence to support any of these recommendations. It could be argued that this is all feel-good, “keep-the-patient entertained” advice with little chance of direct harm. But it is deceptive and dishonest to represent these modalities as effective treatments based on science, especially in a book that is otherwise scientifically reliable.

Other titles
The authors went on to develop a What to Expect series:
 What to Eat When You're Expecting (1986)
 What to Expect: The First Year (1989)
 What to Expect: The Toddler Years (1994)
 What to Expect at Bedtime (2000)
 What to Expect When the New Baby Comes Home (2001)
 What to Expect: Pregnancy Planner (2002)
 What to Expect: Babysitter's Handbook (2003)
 What to Expect at Preschool (2003)
 What to Expect When Mommy's Having a Baby (2004)
 What to Expect: Eating Well When You're Expecting (2005; follow-up to What to Eat When You're Expecting)
 What to Expect: Pregnancy Journal & Organizer (2007)
 What to Expect Before You're Expecting (2009)
 What to Expect: the Second Year (2011)

Digital properties 
WhatToExpect.com debuted in April 2005. The What to Expect mobile app launched on iOS in 2009 and Android in 2014. The digital properties provide information about preconception, pregnancy, the postpartum period, and child and infant health. The app provides users with personalized resources, tools, and information based on their due date or child’s birthday, including 3D renderings, common symptoms, and weekly videos.

What to Expect Project 
In 1997, the author, and former publishing executive, Lisa Bernstein, founded the What to Expect Foundation whose stated mission is to help low-income families expect healthy pregnancies, safe deliveries and happy babies. The Foundation changed its name to What to Expect Project, which is a 501(c)3 public operating charity. The organization’s stated mission is “educate and empower moms in need so they can expect healthier pregnancies, safer deliveries, healthier babies, and healthier futures.”

Film adaptation

Even though the book does not contain a storyline, Lionsgate adapted What to Expect When You're Expecting into a film of the same name directed by Kirk Jones. It features an ensemble cast starring Jennifer Lopez, Cameron Diaz, Elizabeth Banks, Anna Kendrick, Chris Rock, Brooklyn Decker, Rodrigo Santoro,  Rob Huebel, Chace Crawford and Matthew Morrison.  The film was released on May 18, 2012.

References

External links
 
 
 Table of contents from the Library of Congress

Handbooks and manuals
Non-fiction books adapted into films
Works about human pregnancy
Series of non-fiction books
1984 non-fiction books
Workman Publishing Company books